Henry Curtis Beardslee (28 September 1865 – 1 January 1948) was an American mycologist. He published several works with William Chambers Coker, and did a lot of work in Florida with Gertrude Simmons Burlingham after they both retired there.

Beardslee graduated from Painesville High School, in Painesville, Ohio in 1883. He graduated from Western Reserve University in 1889. He was an instructor at Asheville School for boys.

Beardslee's father, also named Henry Curtis Beardslee (1807–1884), was also a botanist.

Species
This is an incomplete list of species in which Beardslee was the author, or co-author with Gertrude Simmons Burlingham (Burl.). The year of description and publication may follow an entry:

Amanita cylindrispora Beardslee 1936
Amanita mutabilis Beardslee 1919
Boletus betula Beardslee 1902
Boletus carolinensis Beardslee
Boletus rubinellus Beardslee
Cortinarius robustus Beardslee
Lactarius cognoscibilis Beardslee & Burl. 1940
Lactarius floridanus Beardslee & Burl. 1940
Lactarius imperceptus Beardslee & Burl. 1940
Lactarius limacinus Beardslee & Burl. 1940
Lactarius paradoxus Beardslee & Burl. 1940
Lactarius proximellus Beardslee & Burl. 1940
Lactarius pseudodeliciosus Beardslee & Burl. 1940
Lepiota caerulea Beardslee
Lepiota floccosa Beardslee
Lepiota parva Beardslee
Mycena anomala Beardslee 1924
Mycena glutinosa Beardslee 1934
Russula admirabilis Beardslee & Burl. 1939
Russula cinerascens Beardslee 1918
Russula flava Beardslee
Russula heterospora Beardslee 1934
Russula magna Beardslee 1918
Russula pungens Beardslee 1918
Russula rubescens Beardslee 1914
Volvaria cinerea Beardslee 1915

See also
List of mycologists

References

American mycologists
1865 births
1948 deaths